Miss Mink of 1949 is a 1949 American comedy film directed by Glenn Tryon (his last film as a director) and written by Arnold Belgard. It stars Jimmy Lydon, Lois Collier (in her final film role), Richard Lane, Barbara Brown, Paul Guilfoyle and June Storey. The film was released on February 11, 1949, by 20th Century Fox.

Plot

Alice Forrester wins a $10,000 mink in a radio contest. Alice's husband Joe is a clerk who works for Herb Pendleton, whose wife Rose desperately wants that coat. Herb offers Joe a promotion and $5,000, telling him it'll save Joe the cost of paying a tax and insurance on the coat as well as taking Alice to expensive places to wear it.

Alice's mother and Uncle Newton live with them. Her mom, Mrs. Marshall, is eager to see Alice socialize in the coat. Newton, an insurance salesman, is given money by Joe to insure it, but Newton's bookie demands the cash.  At a party, Rose shocks Alice by saying the coat now belongs to her. A fight breaks out, the coat is damaged and both Joe and Herb are kicked out of their houses by their wives.

The men scheme to fake a robbery to collect the insurance. Real thieves turn up and flee with the coat, whereupon Joe learns that Newton didn't insure it. The crooks are chased by the cops and hastily discard the mink. O'Mulvaney, a chef, finds it and takes it to wife Maureen, who is thrilled. Everybody ends up rounded up by the police and taken before a judge, who tries to sort out who owns what. Alice ultimately gets to keep the coat and Joe gets a promotion at work with a raise.

Cast   
Jimmy Lydon as Joe Forrester
Lois Collier as Alice Forrester
Richard Lane as Herbert Pendleton
Barbara Brown as Mrs. Marshall
Paul Guilfoyle as Uncle Newton
June Storey as Rose Pendleton
Grandon Rhodes as Nietsche aka Imhoff Schultz
Walter Sande as Sean O'Mulvaney
Don Kohler as Skeet Price
Vera Marshe as Hortense 
Dorothy Granger as Mrs. Maureen O'Mulvaney
Iris Adrian as Mrs. McKelvey

References

External links 
 

1949 films
20th Century Fox films
American comedy films
1949 comedy films
Films directed by Glenn Tryon
Films produced by Sol M. Wurtzel
American black-and-white films
1940s English-language films
1940s American films